The 1975 Baltimore International was a men's tennis tournament played on indoor carpet courts at the Towson State College in Baltimore, Maryland in the United States. The event was part of the 1975 USLTA-IPA Indoor Circuit. It was the fourth edition of the tournament and was held from January 13 through January 19, 1975. Third-seeded Brian Gottfried won the singles title.

Finals

Singles
 Brian Gottfried defeated  Allan Stone 3–6, 6–2, 6–3
 It was Gottfried' 1st singles title of the year and the 4th of his career.

Doubles
 Dick Crealy /  Ray Ruffels defeated  Ismail El Shafei /  Frew McMillan 6–4, 6–3

References

External links
 ITF tournament edition details

Baltimore International
Baltimore International
Baltimore International
Baltimore International